D road may refer to:
 D roads in Malaysia are roads in Kelantan
 D roads in Slovakia are motorways (diaľnica)
 D roads in the Czech Republic are motorways (dálnice)
 D roads in the United Kingdom may be:
 D roads in Great Britain or on the Isle of Man which are local lower traffic roads
 A500 road, a major primary A road in Staffordshire and Cheshire, England
 D roads in Turkey are State Highways of the Republic of Turkey
D roads in the USA  may refer to:
County-Designated Highways in zone D in Michigan
Corridor D, a road from Bridgeport, West Virginia to Cincinnati, Ohio